Soledad, Spanish for "solitude", often refers to María de la Soledad (Our Lady of Solitude), 
a variant name of Mary the mother of Jesus in Roman Catholic tradition.

Soledad may refer to:

People
 Chalon people or Soledad, a Native American people and language of Salinas Valley, California
 Shalani Soledad (born 1980), Filipina politician and TV personality
 Soledad Alvear (born 1950), Chilean politician
 Soledad Bravo (born 1943), Venezuelan singer
 Soledad Brothers, three African-American inmates, including George Jackson, involved in a notable row
 Soledad Chacón (1890–1936), American politician
 Soledad Florendo (born 1903), Filipino physician 
 Soledad Gallego-Díaz (born 1950/1951), Spanish journalist
 Soledad Miranda (1943–1970), Spanish actress
 Soledad O'Brien (born 1966), American broadcast journalist and executive producer
 Soledad Pastorutti (born 1980), Argentine folklore singer

Places
 Soledad, Atlántico, Colombia, a municipality
 La Soledad, Tamaulipas, a city in the 836 area code of Mexico
 Soledad, a barrio in Consolación del Sur, Cuba
 La Soledad, Panama, a corregimiento
 Soledad, San Jose, Camarines Sur, Philippines, a barangay (village)
 Soledad, California, United States, a city
 Mount Soledad, a small mountaintop located in the La Jolla area of San Diego, California

Music
 "Soledad", a musical piece by Astor Piazzolla
 "Soledad", a song by Carlos Gardel
 "Soledad", a song by Don Omar from the 2015 album The Last Don 2
 "Soledad", a song by Emilio José, a 1973 number-one single in Spain
 "Soledad", a song by Eric Burdon and Jimmy Witherspoon from Guilty!
 "Soledad", a song by La Oreja de Van Gogh from El viaje de Copperpot
 "Soledad", a song by Maná from Falta Amor
 "Soledad", a song by Mano Negra from Puta's Fever
 "Soledad", a song by Westlife from Coast to Coast
 "La Soledad", a song by Pink Martini from Sympathique
 "La Soledad", a Spanish-language version of the song "La solitudine" by Laura Pausini

Film and television
Soledad (TV series), a 1980  Mexican telenovela
 Soledad (2001 TV series), a Peruvian telenovela starring Coraima Torres and Guillermo Pérez
 Solitary Fragments (Spanish title La soledad), a 2007 Spanish film by Jaime Rosales
 La Soledad (film), a 2016 Venezuelan film by Jorge Thielen Armand

Other uses
 Fort Soledad, Guam
 Mission Nuestra Señora de la Soledad, California, a Spanish mission colloquially known as Soledad Mission
 Soledad State Prison, Soledad, California
Soledad (novel), a 2001 novel by Angie Cruz

See also
 Soledad Atzompa, Veracruz, Mexico
 Soledad de Doblado, Veracruz, Mexico
 Soledades, a poem by Luis de Góngora

Spanish feminine given names